Burnaby Central Secondary School is a public high school in Burnaby, British Columbia. It is located across from Burnaby City Hall and is adjacent to Deer Lake Park. Burnaby Central is a part of Burnaby School District 41. As of 2015, there are more than 1,400 students attending the school. Classes at Burnaby Central usually follow the semester system. 

This new school building was constructed where the previous school's outdoor field was located. Construction began on a seismically sound school building in 2009 due to the Seismic Mitigation Program (SMP), a seismic upgrading program. Burnaby Central Secondary School's new campus opened in September 2011.

Facilities
Burnaby Central Secondary has three floors and three wings. There are a total of eight staircases, 3 in wing B, 1 in wing A, 1 in wing C, and 3 external staircases. The student commons, a double height high ceiling atrium, sits in the middle of the central wing and separates wings A and C. It contains 52 classrooms. 
Other facilities include:
 Art studios
Cafeteria, Digital recording studio
Competition running track
Electronics lab
Drafting lab
Photography dark rooms
Computer labs
 Teaching kitchen
 Gymnasiums (2)
 Textiles classroom
 Music rooms
 Wrestling room
 Weight room
 Theatre
 Dance studio
 Home economic labs
 Library
 Science labs
 Auto mechanics shop
 Woodwork shop
 Conference centre
 Learning centre.

Notable alumni 
 Sam Adekugbe, soccer player
 Bryce Alderson, soccer player
 Glenn Anderson, ice hockey player
 Marco Carducci, soccer player
 Caleb Clarke
 Roger Cross, actor
 Alphonso Davies, soccer player.
 Rob Feenie, Iron Chef winner and restaurateur
 Ben Fisk, soccer player
 Michael J. Fox, actor, activist, dropped out of school
 Kaleigh Fratkin (born 1992), professional ice hockey player
 Julia Grosso, soccer player
 Farhan Lalji, TSN TV reporter
 Patrick Lussier, film director
 Kenndal McArdle, ice hockey player
 Colin Percival, computer scientist
 Dave Steen, decathlete, Order of Canada recipient (first Canadian to score 8,000 points)
 Adam Straith, soccer player
 Russell Teibert, soccer player
 Dale Walters, retired Olympic boxer

References

External links 
 School website

High schools in Burnaby
Educational institutions established in 1958
1958 establishments in British Columbia